Mohabbatein is a 2000 Indian Hindi-language musical romance film that was written and directed by Aditya Chopra and produced by Yash Chopra of Yash Raj Films. The film stars Amitabh Bachchan, Shah Rukh Khan, and Aishwarya Rai Bachchan, and newcomers Uday Chopra, Shamita Shetty, Jugal Hansraj, Kim Sharma, Jimmy Sheirgill, and Preeti Jhangiani. It narrates the story of Narayan, the strict principal of Gurukul college whose daughter Megha, commits suicide after he opposes her relationship with Raj, a music teacher at the college. The story follows Raj aiding with three Gurukul students and their love interests to rebel against Narayan's intolerance of love.

The film was originally planned to be Aditya Chopra's directorial debut, but it was his second film after Dilwale Dulhania Le Jayenge (1995). Its themes were inspired by those from the 1989 American coming-of-age drama Dead Poets Society. Sharmishta Roy and Karan Johar built the sets and designed the costumes, respectively. The duo Jatin–Lalit composed its music while Anand Bakshi wrote the lyrics.

Mohabbatein released on 27 October 2000 and received widespread acclaim from critics, with Bachchan and Khan's performances garnering the most praise.

At the 46th Filmfare Awards, the film received a leading 12 nominations, including Best Film, Best Director (Aditya), Best Actor (Khan) and Best Supporting Actress (Rai) and won 4 awards, including Best Actor (Critics) (Khan) and Best Supporting Actor (Bachchan). It also received three Bollywood Movie Awards, four International Indian Film Academy Awards, one Screen Award, and two Zee Cine Awards.

Plot 
Narayan has been the strict principal of Gurukul, a prestigious all-boys college, for 25 years. Narayan believes in bringing the best out of his students by emphasizing honour, tradition, and discipline. He disdains fun and is particularly intolerant of romance and threatens to expel any student who is caught having a romantic affair. Despite these rules, three Gurukul students—Sameer, Vicky, and Karan—fall in love. Sameer falls for Sanjana, his childhood friend; Vicky is attracted to Ishika, a student at the neighbouring all-girls college; and Karan is infatuated with Kiran, a young widow whom Karan sees alone one night in a train station.

Narayan hires Raj as Gurukul's new music teacher. Raj believes in the power of love and decides to spread love throughout Gurukul. He sympathizes with the predicaments of Sameer, Vicky, and Karan, and encourages them to persist and stay loyal to their loves. Raj tells the three students he had a special love himself and that although she is dead, he imagines she accompanies him every day. One day, as part of his plan, Raj throws a party, to which he invites the students of the all-girls college. Narayan discovers the party and threatens to dismiss Raj. At this point, Raj reveals he had been a student at Gurukul over a decade earlier and that he had fallen in love with Megha, Narayan's only daughter. Narayan had summarily expelled Raj from the college and the distraught Megha had committed suicide. Raj returns to Gurukul to honour Megha's memory by reversing the college's zero-tolerance policy on romance; he promises he will fill the school with love and that Narayan will be unable to stop it. Narayan is shocked; he takes this as a challenge and allows Raj to remain.

Sameer, Vicky, and Karan are able to win over Sanjana, Ishika, and Kiran, respectively, but Narayan retaliates by tightening the college's rules. The student body, however, encouraged by Raj, continues to defy the rules and in a final effort to preserve the school atmosphere he has built up for 25 years, Narayan expels the three students. Raj speaks up on their behalf, stating they did nothing wrong by falling in love and accusing Narayan of causing his own daughter's death with his intolerance of love. Raj also says he feels Narayan lost the challenge because his daughter left him and now Raj, who considered Narayan an elder, is leaving him as well. Raj's words hurt Narayan, who realizes his strict no-romance policy is misguided. Narayan apologizes to the student body, resigns as principal of Gurukul, and nominates Raj as his successor. Raj accepts and reconciles with Narayan.

Cast 
The cast is listed below:

 Amitabh Bachchan as Narayan Shankar, Megha's father and Principal of Gurukul
 Shah Rukh Khan as Raj Aryan Malhotra, Megha's love interest and Music teacher at Gurukul
 Aishwarya Rai Bachchan as Megha Shankar, Narayan's daughter and Raj Aryan's love interest
 Uday Chopra as Vikram “Vicky” Kapoor, Ishika's love interest and a student at Gurukul
 Jugal Hansraj as Sameer Sharma, Sanjana's love interest and a student at Gurukul
 Jimmy Sheirgill as Karan Choudhry, Kiran's love interest and a student at Gurukul
 Shamita Shetty as Ishika Dhanrajgir, Vicky's love interest
 Kim Sharma as Sanjana Paul, Sameer's love interest
 Preeti Jhangiani as Kiran Khanna, Karan's love interest and Major General Khanna's daughter-in-law
 Amrish Puri as Major General Khanna, Kiran's father-in-law (special appearance)
 Shefali Shah as Nandini Khanna (special appearance)
 Anupam Kher as Kakke
 Archana Puran Singh as Preeto
 Helen as Miss Monica (special appearance)
 Parzan Dastur as Ayush Khanna, Kiran's cousin
 Saurabh Shukla as Tom Paul, Sanjana's father (special appearance)
 Ram Mohan as Khan Baba
 Meghna Patel as Ishika's friend

Production 

Before the production of the romantic drama Dilwale Dulhania Le Jayenge (1995)—one of the highest-grossing films and the longest-running film in Indian cinema history—Aditya Chopra had started to write Mohabbatein to make his directorial debut. Chopra felt Mohabbatein subject matter was too mature, making Dilwale Dulhania Le Jayenge his first film as a director and Mohabbatein his second. Wanting his next film to have different themes, he conceived Mohabbatein as a thriller but changed his mind and decided to make another romantic film. He stated, "I realized that there is something in that story that keeps drawing me to it, so one day I just shut my thriller file and casually picked up my [...] Mohabbatein file—that one simple action decided my second film for me".

Aditya Chopra started to write Mohabbatein after the release of Dil To Pagal Hai (1997) — he wanted it to be about more than just romantic stories. According to the Encyclopaedia of Hindi Cinema, the film was inspired by the 1989 American coming-of-age drama Dead Poets Society. Chopra then narrated Mohabbatein to his father Yash Chopra, who was impressed by it; the latter also produced the film under his banner Yash Raj Films. In a Screen interview, Yash Chopra described it as "a modern film, a film about today and it has all the ingredients of entertainment for people of all ages". He said the film shows the honour of Indian traditions and their values, adding, "On the whole Aditya has made an honest film, honest to God and honest to the audience who has given us so much". The project was announced in June 1999 on Yash Raj Films' website.

Aditya Chopra told his father he would cast Amitabh Bachchan, Shah Rukh Khan, and Aishwarya Rai Bachchan in the lead roles, saying he could not think of other suitable actors; the three immediately accepted. Mohabbatein is Khan's second collaboration with Rai after Josh (2000), and the first with Bachchan. Kajol was the first choice for the role of Megha, but she declined it because of her marriage. Bachchan, playing Narayan, felt the part was his best role after Deewaar (1975), and said he only accepted the part because of "the fantastic script" by Aditya Chopra, whom he called "the little boy". To complete the casting, Chopra sought six new actors; three male and three female. Aditya's brother Uday Chopra wanted to make his acting debut in the film; Aditya Chopra and his assistants travelled across India to find the other five newcomers; he cast Shamita Shetty, Jugal Hansraj, Kim Sharma, Jimmy Sheirgill, and Preeti Jhangiani. A gymnasium was built specifically for their training before filming began. Amrish Puri, Shefali Shah, and Helen made special appearances. Aditya Chopra also wrote the film's dialogue.

The principal photography of Mohabbatein was handled by Manmohan Singh and commenced on 25 October 1999, taking place in the United Kingdom. Karan Johar designed the costumes for Bachchan and Khan while Manish Malhotra designed them for Rai. Farah Khan was the choreographer. Sharmishta Roy, a frequent collaborator with Yash Raj Films, served as the art director. When asked by Shilpa Bharatan-Iyer of Rediff.com, Roy described the film as a "learning experience"; she used many stones for Narayan's office sets and went to Lohar Chawl to buy several additional properties. Roy said she had a good rapport with Aditya Chopra and that the film's production gave her many challenges; "Look, every day, I put up houses. The challenge is in "individualising", in "personalising" each house to suit the script and the characters in the narrative."
Roy designed 13 or 14 sets for the film. Filming ended between August and September 2000; it was edited by V. Karnik, and Anuj Mathur and Kunal Mehta were the film's sound designers.

Music 

The duo Jatin–Lalit composed Mohabbatein soundtrack and the lyrics were written by Anand Bakshi. The vocals were performed by the debutantes Ishaan, Manohar Shetty, Pritha Mazumdar, Shweta Pandit, Sonali Bhatawdekar, and Udhbhav. Lalit told Rediff.com he thought it was "a good idea to have fresh voices for the newcomers so that it also helps the album sound fresh", and said he and Jatin experienced difficulty while suiting their voices. Lata Mangeshkar, Udit Narayan, Shah Rukh Khan, and Jaspinder Narula also provided vocals. The film's soundtrack album has seven original songs and two background scores, and was released on 21 January 2000 by Yash Raj Films' subsidiary YRF Music.

Critical response to the soundtrack of Mohabbatein was mixed. According to Screen, "Jatin-Lalit's music, though not chartbuster stuff, is melodious and situational. It grows on you as you watch the film." Ratna Malay of Bollywood Hungama called it "a typical Yash Chopra kind with a mixture" of Dil To Pagal Hai. Writing for Planet Bollywood, Avinash Ramchandani described it as "an outstanding album with several new singers making a splendid debut, as well as a commendable job by Jatin-Lalit, and brilliant lyrics by Anand Bakshi" but Hindustan Times called it "[absolutely] dud". According to the film-trade website Box Office India, the soundtrack album sold five million copies and became the highest-selling Bollywood soundtrack of the year. Jatin–Lalit received a nomination for the Best Music Director at the 46th Filmfare Awards, and were also nominated in the same category at the Bollywood Movie Awards and Screen Awards.

Release 
Mohabbatein was one of the most anticipated films of the year and the audience's expectations were high. On 8 October 2000, a special screening for the film in Film City was organized with Aditya Chopra, Bachchan and his son Abhishek Bachchan, Shah Rukh Khan and his wife Gauri Khan, and Johar in attendance. The film was released theatrically on 27 October during the Diwali celebrations; its release clashed with those of Vidhu Vinod Chopra's thriller Mission Kashmir and K. S. Ravikumar's comedy-drama Thenali. Due to its lengthy running time, theatres screened three shows daily rather than four.

Mohabbatein was opened on 315 screens across India and grossed  on the first day. The film collected  in India and $4.2 million overseas. Box Office India estimated the film's total gross to be , making it the highest-grossing Indian film of the year. It ran at theatres for over 175 days, becoming a silver jubilee film. Mohabbatein was released on DVD in a double-disc pack on 20 November in all regions. The broadcast rights of the movie were acquired to Sony Network. It has been available for streaming on Amazon Prime Video and Apple TV+ since 18 November 2016.

Critical reception 
Mohabbatein received widespread critical acclaim upon release, with Bachchan and Khan's performances garnering the highest praise. Savera R. Someshwar of Rediff.com commented the film "is a mish-mash alright. But it is also a successful, feelgood film." She described both actors as "the two pillars on which this film is built and each time they come face-to-face, there is this expectant hush." Taran Adarsh of Bollywood Hungama rated the film 4 stars out of 5, praising Aditya Chopra for handling the confrontation sequences between the two "with aplomb". He added the director "is at his best", saying, "Not once do you feel that the writer in Chopra has tilted on any one side". Vinayak Chakravorty concluded, "Clearly, Aditya Chopra faces a downhill task this time around. Shorn of a solid script, bereft of impressive treatment and lacking any directorial credibility to hold his [...] mega dream [...] Mohabbatein is a veritable lesson to any budding filmmaker on how not to make a film". Zee Next'''s Vinaya Hagde gave a scathing review of the film, calling it "dumb", and saying Kher and Singh were "totally wasted".

Reviewing Mohabbatein for The Hindu, Savitha Padmanabhan criticized the film's duration and the way the confrontation sequences between Bachchan and Khan "are always interrupted by the love stories of the teenyboppers" but Filmfare anonymous reviewer appreciated them for "[excelling] in their respective roles". Nikhat Kazmi called the film the "inglorious uncertainties of cinema" and Khalid Mohamed wrote, "Back in the romantic mode, Aditya Chopra's Mohabbatein is indeed like a rich, multi-layered, vibgyor cake. But frankly, only a few slices tickle the taste-buds." Suman Tarafdar from Filmfare said most of the cast members "look so unconvinced about their roles and perform accordingly". Screen said Aditya Chopra's "untiring efforts are visible in every frame and his mastery over screenplay is evident throughout the first half". Comparing the film with Dilwale Dulhania Le Jayenge in his review for India Today, Dinesh Raheja said Mohabbatein'' "has too many diverse strands and in a bid to avoid getting knotted up in them", and considered the story is "disappointingly pat and oversimplified".

See also 
 List of accolades received by Mohabbatein

Notes

References

External links 
 
 
 

2000s Hindi-language films
2000s buddy films
2000s musical drama films
2000 romantic drama films
2000 films
Films scored by Jatin–Lalit
Films shot in England
Indian buddy films
Indian coming-of-age films
Films about scandalous teacher–student relationships
Indian romantic musical films
Indian musical drama films
Yash Raj Films films
Films directed by Aditya Chopra